Borovitsky (masculine), Borovitskaya (feminine), or Borovitskoye (neuter) may refer to:
Borovitsky Hill, former name of Kremlin Hill, one of the seven hills of Moscow
Borovitskaya (Metro), a station of the Moscow Metro
Borovitskaya Square, a square in Moscow, Russia
Borovitskaya Tower, one of the Kremlin towers